"Traidora" (feminine of Traidor ) is a song by Cuban duo Gente de Zona featuring American singer Marc Anthony. The music video of the song was directed by Alejandro Pérez and was filmed in Miami, Florida. As of January 2018, the video has received over 320 million views on YouTube.

Charts

Weekly charts

Year-end charts

Certifications

Awards and nominations

References

2015 singles
2015 songs
Gente de Zona songs
Marc Anthony songs
Sony Music Latin singles
Spanish-language songs